The USA men's national under-19 basketball team, is controlled by USA Basketball, and represents the United States in international under-19 and under-18 (under age 19 and under age 18) basketball competitions.

Competitive record
A red box around the year indicates tournaments played within the United States

FIBA Under-19 World Cup

FIBA Americas Under-18 Championship

See also
 United States men's national basketball team
 United States men's national under-17 basketball team
 United States women's national basketball team
 United States women's national under-19 basketball team
 United States women's national under-17 basketball team
 United States men's national 3x3 team
 United States women's national 3x3 team

References

External links

Official Site
FIBA Profile
USA Olympic Basketball Team Rosters and Stats @ basketball-reference.com

Men's national under-19 basketball teams
United States national youth basketball teams